Dartmouth is an urban community and former city located in the Halifax Regional Municipality of Nova Scotia, Canada. Dartmouth is located on the eastern shore of Halifax Harbour. Dartmouth has been nicknamed the City of Lakes, after the large number of lakes located within its boundaries.

On April 1, 1996, the provincial government amalgamated all the municipalities within the boundaries of Halifax County into a single-tier regional government named the Halifax Regional Municipality (HRM). Dartmouth and its neighbouring city of Halifax, the town of Bedford and the Municipality of the County of Halifax were dissolved. The city of Dartmouth forms part of the urban core of the larger regional municipality and is officially designated as part of the "capital district" by the Halifax Regional Municipality. At the time that the City of Dartmouth was dissolved, the provincial government altered its status to a separate community to Halifax; however, its status as part of the metropolitan "Halifax" urban core existed prior to municipal reorganization in 1996.

Dartmouth is still an official geographic name that is used by all levels of government for legal purposes, postal service, mapping, 9-1-1 emergency response, municipal planning, and is recognized by the Halifax Regional Municipality as a civic addressing community. The official place name did not change, due to the confusion with similar street names, land use planning set out by the former "City of Dartmouth," and significant public pressure. Today the same development planning for Downtown Dartmouth and the rest of the region is still in force, as well as specific bylaws created prior to April 1, 1996.

History

Father Le Loutre's War began when Edward Cornwallis arrived to establish Halifax with 13 transports on June 21, 1749. By unilaterally establishing Halifax, the British were violating earlier treaties with the Miꞌkmaq (1726), which were signed after Father Rale's War. The British quickly began to build other settlements. To guard against Miꞌkmaq, Acadian, and French attacks on the new Protestant settlements, British fortifications were erected in Halifax (1749), Dartmouth (1750), Bedford (Fort Sackville) (1751), Lunenburg (1753), and Lawrencetown (1754).

In 1750, the sailing ship Alderney arrived with 151 immigrants. Municipal officials at Halifax decided that these new arrivals should be settled on the eastern side of Halifax Harbour. During the early years, eight  Acadian and Miꞌkmaq raids were made on the new British settlement, such as the Raid on Dartmouth (1751).

The original settlement was made in an area the Miꞌkmaq called Ponamogoatitjg (Boonamoogwaddy), which has been varyingly translated as "Tomcod Ground" or "Salmon Place" in reference to the fish that were presumably caught in this part of Halifax Harbour. The community was later given the English name of Dartmouth in honour of William Legge, 1st Earl of Dartmouth, who was a former secretary of state. By 1752, 53 families consisting of 193 people lived in the community.

Dartmouth was initially a sawmill and agricultural outpost of Halifax. In the mid-19th century, though, it grew, first with the construction of the Shubenacadie Canal and more importantly with the rise of successful industrial firms such as the Dartmouth Marine Slips, the Starr Manufacturing Company, and the Stairs Ropeworks.

In 1873, Dartmouth was incorporated as a town, and a town hall was established in 1877. In 1955, the town was permanently linked to Halifax by the Angus L. Macdonald Bridge, which led to rapid suburban growth. The Town of Dartmouth amalgamated with several neighbouring villages into the City of Dartmouth in 1961. The A. Murray MacKay Bridge opened in 1970, furthering commercial and residential growth. The Dartmouth General Hospital opened in 1976.

The city was dissolved on April 1, 1996, when its government was amalgamated into the Halifax Regional Municipality.

Municipal government
Dartmouth is represented municipally in Halifax Regional Council by these districts:
 District 3 - Dartmouth South - Eastern Passage
 District  5 - Dartmouth Centre
 District 6 - Harbourview - Burnside - Dartmouth East
The HRM community council for Dartmouth, the Harbour East - Marine Drive Community Council, is held in various locations  on the first Thursday of every month.

Economy
The city was not only a bedroom community for Halifax, but also had commerce and industries of its own, including the Volvo Halifax Assembly plant, and a molasses plant dating back to the days of the triangular trade with the West Indies. Today, Dartmouth is home to the shopping district of Dartmouth Crossing, as well as federal government offices, many located in the Queen Square building on Alderney Drive.

Dartmouth also had the first IKEA store in Canada and the Americas, which operated between 1975 and 1988. IKEA returned to the city in 2017 in a different location, serving the entire Halifax Regional Municipality.

Transportation and communications

Transportation
Dartmouth is linked to Halifax by the oldest continuously operating saltwater ferry service in North America with the first crossing having taken place in 1752. Early ferries were powered by horses, which were replaced with steam engines in 1830. During the early 20th century, ferries shuttled pedestrians and vehicles between the downtown areas of Halifax and Dartmouth. A railway trestle was built across Halifax Harbour in the late 19th century to bring rail service to Dartmouth, but it was destroyed by a storm, requiring the present railway connection built around Bedford Basin.

During the early 1950s, construction began on the Angus L. Macdonald Bridge, a suspension bridge crossing Halifax Harbour. It opened in 1955, ushering in an unprecedented development boom in Dartmouth. New subdivisions, shopping centres, office buildings, and industrial parks have been built in recent decades. A second bridge, the A. Murray MacKay Bridge, was opened in 1970 and the Highway 111 Circumferential Highway was built around Dartmouth to Woodside at this time.

Communications

 The first three digits of the postal codes are B2V, B2W, B2X, B2Y, B3A, B3B
 The telephone exchanges are 902: 462, 463, 433, 434, 435, 461, 464, 465, 466, 468, 469 - Bell Aliant; 404, 407, 431, 444, 446, 478, 497, 225, 229 - Eastlink; 401, 402, 405, 406, 412, 441, 449 - Rogers Wireless; 209, 802, 830, 877 - Telus
 Internet: Cable - Eastlink; DSL - Bell Aliant
 Cable TV - Eastlink, Bell Aliant

Natal Day
 Dartmouthians celebrate a civic holiday known as "Natal Day" since August 1895. The concept originated as a means to celebrate the arrival of the railway, but construction of the railway tracks was incomplete on the appointed day. Since all the preparations for the festivities were ready, organizers decided to go ahead with a celebration of the municipality's birthday instead.
 In 1941, the Dartmouth Natal Committee decided to erect a cairn in honour of the spirit and courage of the first English settlers to Dartmouth's shore. It is situated in Leighton Dillman Park, part of the common lands left to the community by the Quakers, and it overlooks the harbour where the first settlers built their homes. The monument stands three meters high and is constructed from rocks gathered on Martinique Beach. A plaque in front of the cairn is inscribed and describes the arrival of the Alderney "on August 12, 1750 with 353 settlers."

Demographics

The former City of Dartmouth, at the time of the 1996 census, covered 58.57 km2 and housed 65,629 people. After 1 April 1996, the former city was turned into an urban community of the Halifax Regional Municipality.

Geography

Neighbourhoods of Dartmouth include:
Albro Lake
Bel Ayr Park
Brightwood
Burnside
Commodore Park
Cranberry
Crichton Park
Crystal Heights
Dartmouth Crossing
Downtown Dartmouth
Ellenvale
Grahams Corner
Greenough Settlement
Harbourview
Highfield Park
Imperoyal
Manor Park
Montebello
Nantucket
Notting Park
Port Wallace
Portland Estates
Portland Hills
Russell Lake West
Shannon Park
Southdale
Tam O'Shanter Ridge
Tufts Cove
Wallace Heights
Westphal
Wildwood Lake
Woodlawn
Woodside

The oldest structure in Dartmouth is the house of William Ray, a Quaker and cooper from Nantucket who moved to Dartmouth in 1785-86 as a whaler. Its materials and construction methods closely resemble Quaker architecture in Nantucket, such as the asymmetrical façade design and stone foundation. It is located at 59 Ochterloney Street, and is believed to have been built around 1785 or 1786. Today, it is a museum, furnished as a typical modest dwelling of a merchant of that time.

Dartmouth's city hall was built in the early 1960s on the waterfront adjacent to the Alderney Ferry Terminal. The building was declared surplus and sold to Starfish Properties, and was to be redeveloped.

Military
Dartmouth has been home to several Canadian Forces installations:

 CFB Shearwater, located on the southern border of Dartmouth, is an air force base, formerly known as Naval Air Station Halifax, RCAF Station Dartmouth, RCAF Station Shearwater, HMCS Shearwater, and RCNAS Shearwater.
 HMC Naval Radio Station Albro Lake is a radio transmitter/receiver facility.
 CFB Halifax adjunct is an area on the Dartmouth waterfront opposite HMC Dockyard.
 Wallace Heights is a former military housing area in north-end Dartmouth.
 Shannon Park is an unused military housing area in north-end Dartmouth.
 Canadian Forces Ammunition Depot Bedford is a munitions magazine for Maritime Forces Atlantic, located on the border between Dartmouth and Bedford.

Notable people
 Scott Frederick Cameron, 35th Canadian surgeon general
 Custio Clayton, boxer
 Steve Giles, Olympic paddler
 Vince Horsman, former MLB pitcher
 Michael Jackson, actor in Trailer Park Boys
 Mike Johnston, NHL/WHL hockey coach
 Ruby Keeler, 1930s Hollywood starlet
 Chris Kelades, mixed martial arts and UFC fighter
 Don Koharski, former NHL referee
 Wendy Lill, playwright, represented Dartmouth as a two-term New Democratic Party member of Parliament
 Kevin MacMichael, musician, Cutting Crew guitarist, attended Dartmouth High School
 Matt Mays, indie rock musician
 Christian Murray, actor, writer
 Arnie Patterson, broadcaster (CFDR and Q104 radio) and former press secretary to Prime Minister of Canada Pierre Trudeau
 Constance Piers (1866–1939), journalist, poet, editor
 Joel Plaskett, indie rock musician
 Andrew Russell, Olympic sprint canoeist
 John Paul Tremblay, actor in Trailer Park Boys
 James Tupper, actor
 Robb Wells, actor in Trailer Park Boys
 Lindell Wigginton, basketball player in the National Basketball Association
 Aisling Chin-Yee, film director, writer, and producer.

Symbols

 Dartmouth is nicknamed "The City of Lakes". Boasting 23 lakes within its boundaries, Dartmouthians take special pride in the chain of lakes within its boundaries that form part of the Shubenacadie Canal. Most famous amongst these is Lake Banook, which provides an excellent location for recreation and attractive vistas. Dartmouth's most historic body of water is the artificial Sullivan's Pond, located north-east of the downtown area on Ochterloney Street. It was dug in the 1830s as part of the Shubenacadie Canal to connect Halifax Harbour with Cobequid Bay on the Bay of Fundy.
Dartmouth was Halifax's sister city. 
Dartmouth's motto is located on its city crest is Amicitia Crescimus.

Culture

 The television show Trailer Park Boys is set in a fictional Dartmouth trailer park and filmed in Dartmouth and its environs. The show features actors (such as Robb Wells) and writers from Dartmouth. A documentary film about the creation and production of the Trailer Park Boys series is entitled Hearts of Dartmouth.
 The television show Diggstown is filmed in and around Dartmouth.
The community hosted the ICF Canoe Sprint World Championships in 1997 and 2009 and with Halifax co-hosted the initial Canada Summer Games in 1969.

References

External links

 
 Official Halifax Municipal Government website

 
Former cities in Nova Scotia
Populated places established in 1750
Populated places disestablished in 1996
1996 disestablishments in Nova Scotia
Communities in Halifax, Nova Scotia
History of Halifax, Nova Scotia
Populated coastal places in Canada
1750 establishments in the British Empire